The men's high jump event at the 2018 African Championships in Athletics was held on 3 August in Asaba, Nigeria.

Results

References

2018 African Championships in Athletics
High jump at the African Championships in Athletics